2011–12 Hong Kong Third Division League is divided into Hong Kong Third 'A' Division League and Hong Kong Third 'District' Division League. For the Third 'A' Division League, this year is the 61st season, while for the Third 'District' Division League, this year is the 10th season.

Changes from last season

Team Changes

From Third Division League

Promoted to Second Division League
Wanchai
Kwun Tong

Team Disqualified

To Third Division League

Relegated from Second Division League
Fukien
Lucky Mile

Team Overview

Third 'A' Division League

Third 'District' Division League

League table

Third 'A' Division League

Third 'District' Division League

Champions play-off

Champions play-off

See also
 The Hong Kong Football Association
 Hong Kong First Division League
 Hong Kong Second Division League
 Hong Kong Third Division League
 2010–11 Hong Kong Second Division League

References

External links
 The Hong Kong Football Association
 Hong Kong Football

3
Hong Kong Third Division League seasons